The Helios Foundation, is a registered charity based in Kings Cross, London. Their mission is to advance the study and practice of the arts and sciences pertaining to holistic health.

History
Established in 1982 to provide counselling, psychotherapy and healing to people with long term illness and those suffering discrimination, particularly those with LGBT issues resulting in psychological stress and trauma.

Helios was quick to respond to the AIDS crisis and, in 1987, started to run support groups for those affected. In 1992, they moved into their Kings Cross premises and began to provide a wide range of complementary therapy options alongside the psychotherapy needed to deal with the trauma of having this condition when there was no effective drug therapy available.

Therapies included: psychodynamic & person centred counselling, psychotherapy, life coaching, couple counselling and hypnotherapy alongside 28 different complementary therapies including acupuncture, osteopathy, ayurveda, reflexology, and nutrition.

In 1998, the Helios all-embracing approach to health was studied by Professor Colin Francome of the Middlesex University and he concluded that: “the results of this survey show very clearly that the HIV programmes provided by the Helios Foundation do bring considerable benefit to the participants. The medical results were impressive and markedly superior to outcomes and trends reported elsewhere, particularly with regard to mortality.” Only 5 Helios clients died over this period, an exceptional result. A further study, in 2007, confirmed and updated these results.

In 2008, the charity’s founder and director, Greg Branson, received the Exceptional Carer award from the London Borough of Camden.

In 2010, the charity received a 5-year Big Lottery ‘Reaching Communities’ grant for counselling and support services to BME HIV+ women, LGBT seniors and HIV+ people returning to work.

Services
It is widely believed that HIV is no longer a serious problem but there are currently 103,700 people in the UK living with HIV with a high percentage of those having had the condition for many years. In 2014, 613 people died here, with over 50% of these from the BME community. 6,151 were newly diagnosed and late diagnosis remains a key challenge.

Helios mostly sees people at this worst end of the HIV spectrum and continues to provide integrated holistic services to address the continuing problems of long-term HIV+ people facing organ deterioration and incapacity and late diagnosed BME women who are not responding well to medication.

The issue of migrants’ health is often unrecognised. Many have significantly less access to the healthcare and support services they need. Refugees are often doubly discriminated against: firstly for simply being refugees and secondly for being accused of spreading HIV/AIDS into their communities where they are marginalised and have to deal with stigma and rejection.

Helios does a great deal of outreach providing services for clients of the Mildmay Hospice, Food Chain, Positive UK and many others.

In recent years, the charity’s remit has been extended to serve people with a wide range of psychological issues alongside physical conditions such as cancer, hepatitis and lupus.  The individual programmes of treatment are drawn from:
 Nutrition, naturopathy and natural remedies,
 Groups to address lifestyle issues,
 Physical and subtle therapies - such as lymph drainage & acupuncture,
 A wide range of psychological therapies,
 Advocacy for disabled clients facing sanctions and loss of benefits, and
 Spiritual practices – including mindfulness meditation, yoga and qi gong.

For 25 years, the Helios dual approach has comprehensively addressed both the physical and psychological needs of clients. The Kings Fund report: (Bringing together physical and mental health: A new frontier for integrated care. March 2016)confirmed that people with long term physical conditions show a high level of mental health difficulties.

References

External links
 The Helios Foundation

Health charities in the United Kingdom
HIV/AIDS organisations in the United Kingdom